Blake Blackburn (born 3 August 1992) is an Australian sports shooter. He competed in the men's 10 metre air pistol event at the 2016 Summer Olympics.

References

External links
 

1992 births
Living people
Australian male sport shooters
Olympic shooters of Australia
Shooters at the 2016 Summer Olympics
Place of birth missing (living people)